Songhai is a fusion flamenco album by Spanish band Ketama, working in collaboration with Malian kora player Toumani Diabaté and other musicians.

For further information see Songhai (musical collaboration)

Track listing
Side A
"Jarabi" – (Traditional, arranged by Toumani Diabate) – 3:40
"Mani Mani Kuru" – (Toumani Diabate) – 5:29
"Caramelo" – (Juan Carmona) – 4:18
"A Toumani" – (José Soto) – 3:28
Side B
"Vente pa Madrid" – (Antonio Carmona, José Miguel Carmona) – 4:34
"Africa" – (Toumani Diabate) – 5:23
"A mi tía Marina" – (José Miguel Carmona) – 3:36
"Ne Ne Koitaa" – (Traditional, arranged by Toumani Diabate) – 3:17

Personnel
 Toumani Djabate – kora, vocals
Ketama:
 José Soto – vocals, guitar
 Juan Carmona – guitar, handclaps; guitar solo (track 3)
 Antonio Carmona – percussion, guitar; vocals (track 5)
 José Miguel Carmona – guitar, emulator; vocals (track 5)
 Danny Thompson – double bass
 Diaw Kouyate – vocals (tracks 2, 6)
 Djanka Diabate – vocals (tracks 2, 6)
 Marcelo Carlos Fuentes – electric bass (tracks 5, 7)
 Josè Luis Carmona – backing vocals (track 5)
 Guillermo – backing vocals (track 5)

Albums produced by Joe Boyd
World music albums
1988 albums